Chandrika Devi Temple is a sacred temple of one of the many forms of Hindu Mother Goddess Durga in the city of Lucknow, Uttar Pradesh, India. It is a prominent pilgrimage site for locals and Interstate. It is also a tourist destination for the people of adjoining cities and rural folks.

History 
It is situated on the bank of river Gomti  at the north-west of National Highway No.24 (Lucknow-Sitapur Road) in Kathwara village, near Bakshi ka talab, Lucknow City. This temple is 300 years old and is well known for the deity Chandrika Devi - a form of Goddess Durga. Located in a natural environment encircled by river Gomti at north, west and south side, it is around 28 km away from the main city of Lucknow. It is about 45 km away from Lucknow Airport. This place and nearby areas have relevance and religious significance since the time of the Ramayana. It is also called Mahi Sagar Teerth. There is mention of this temple in the holy books of Skand and Karma Puran.

It is said that elder son of Shri Lakshmana - the founder of Lucknow, Rajkumar Chandraketu, was once passing with Ashwamegh Horse through Gomti. In the way, it became dark and hence he had to take rest in the then dense forest. He prayed Goddess for safety. Within a moment there was cool moon light and the Goddess appeared before him and assured him. It is said that a grand temple established here during that era was destroyed in 12th century by foreign invaders. It is also said that around 250 years back some nearby villagers, while roaming in the forests, located this beautiful place- which was hidden with dense forests. Next day, a villager could locate the statue of Devi and it was placed at the present place. Later on, a temple was constructed and since then people continued to visit this temple and offer 'Pooja' after knowing the appearance of Ma Chandrika Devi. This place is also known as Mahi Sagar Teerth.

It is also said that in Dvapara Yuga God Shri Krishna advised Barbreek, son of Ghatotkach, about the Tirth for acquiring power. Barbreek worshiped Ma Chandrika Devi for continuous 3 years at this place.

On the eve of Amavasya and Navratras, a lot of religious activities in the temple and around the temple premises are held. People from different parts of the State, come here for Hawan (Yagya), Mundan (total hair-cut). In addition, during these days, Kirtans, satsang (religious meetings) are also held.
It also said that Chandrika (jewelry worn by women on head) part of devi sati fell here.
A Mela vikas samiti and Radhey lal bajpai and ramashre bajpai have been managing this place for a long time and taking care of this place.

References

Temples in Lucknow
Hindu temples in Uttar Pradesh